The Stuttgart–Wendlingen high-speed railway is a proposed German high-speed line to be built as part of the Stuttgart 21 project. It runs from Stuttgart Hauptbahnhof via the Filder Tunnel to the Filder plain and from there to the Neckar valley at Wendlingen, where it runs on to the Wendlingen–Ulm high-speed line. It is part of the Paris-Budapest axis as defined by the European Union.

The line would connect the new Filder station via the Airport Loop, and another line would connect to the existing airport station.

The design speed of the approximately 25.2 km line is mostly 250 km/h. It would enter commercial service in December 2024.

Route
The line run from Stuttgart station to the south through the 9,468 metre long Filder Tunnel and surface southwest of Stuttgart-Plieningen near Stuttgart Airport and the A8 autobahn. It then runs to the east parallel with the A8 on its north side for about 10 kilometres to the Denkendorf service area. Between Denkendorf and Neuhausen the line runs under the A 8 in a 768 m long Denkendorf Tunnel and then runs parallel with it on its south side to the southeast. On the western abutment of the Neckar Bridge at Wendlingen the line becomes the proposed Wendlingen–Ulm high-speed line.

References

Railway lines in Baden-Württemberg
High-speed railway lines in Germany